King Richard is a 2021 American biographical sports drama film directed by Reinaldo Marcus Green and written by Zach Baylin. The film stars Will Smith as Richard Williams, the father and coach of famed tennis players Venus and Serena Williams (both of whom served as executive producers on the film), with Aunjanue Ellis, Saniyya Sidney, Demi Singleton, Tony Goldwyn, and Jon Bernthal in supporting roles.

It premiered at the 48th Telluride Film Festival on September 2, 2021, and was theatrically released on November 19, 2021, by Warner Bros. Pictures and on the HBO Max streaming service. It grossed $39 million against a budget of $50 million, and received positive reviews from critics, with praise for the screenplay and the performances of Smith, Ellis, and Sidney.

It was named one of the ten best films of the year by both the American Film Institute and the National Board of Review. It earned six nominations at the 94th Academy Awards, including Best Picture, and won Best Actor for Smith.

Plot 
Richard Williams lives in Compton, California, with his wife Brandy, his three step-daughters, and his two daughters, Venus and Serena. Richard aspires to turn Venus and Serena into professional tennis players; he has prepared a plan for success since before they were born. Richard and Brandy coach Venus and Serena on a daily basis, while also working as a security guard and a nurse, respectively. Richard works tirelessly to find a professional coach for the girls, creating brochures and videotapes to advertise their skills, but has not had success.

One day, Richard takes the girls to see coach Paul Cohen, who is in the middle of practicing with John McEnroe and Pete Sampras. Despite his initial reservations, he agrees to watch the girls practice, and is impressed. However, the Williamses cannot afford professional coaching, and Paul refuses to coach both girls for free; he selects Venus to receive his coaching, while Serena continues to practice with Brandy. Paul encourages Venus to participate in juniors tournaments. She quickly finds success, but Richard stresses to Venus and her sisters that they should remain humble despite their success. At one of Venus's tournaments, Serena also signs up to play, unbeknownst to Richard. As both girls continue to succeed, the family are treated as outsiders among the predominantly white, upper-class competition. Richard meets with high-profile agents, but, fearing that his daughters will be taken advantage of, pulls them out of the junior circuit entirely. Paul warns him that his decision will destroy the girls’ chances to turn pro, but Richard stands firm, firing Paul as a coach.

Coach Rick Macci travels to California to see the girls play. Impressed, he takes the girls on, and the family relocates to Florida to train at his facility. Richard surprises Rick by reiterating that the girls will not play juniors, instead training and attending school like normal little girls. In the ensuing three years, questions arise from the media and from Rick about Richard's strategy with the girls and his desire for media exposure. Venus tells Rick that she wants to turn pro. Richard reluctantly agrees, but later reneges, worrying that she will suffer a similar fate to Rick's pupil Jennifer Capriati, who is allegedly suffering from burnout and has been arrested for drug possession. The decision strains Richard's relationships with Venus, Brandy, and Rick. After an argument with Brandy, he reconciles with Venus, agreeing to let her play in the upcoming Bank of the West Classic in  Oakland, California. Before the tournament, the family meets with a Nike executive, who offers them a major sponsorship deal worth 3 million dollars. Rick urges them to accept, but the family collectively agrees to decline, believing that once Venus begins to play she will attract more lucrative offers.

Venus initially struggles in her first professional match against Shaun Stafford, but eventually triumphs. She comes in as a heavy underdog in her next match against top-seeded Arantxa Sánchez Vicario. Venus takes the first set and leads in the second before Vicario takes an extended bathroom break, an apparent act of gamesmanship. Sánchez Vicario recovers to win the second set and the match. Richard and Brandy comfort a dejected Venus, telling her to be proud. As the family leaves the stadium, a large crowd of supporters is waiting to cheer her on, and Rick tells Richard that several major shoe companies are anxious to meet with Venus.

An epilogue reveals that nine months later, at the age of 15 Venus would sign a contract with Reebok for $12 million. She would go on to win Wimbledon five times and become the first African American woman to be ranked number one in the world during the Open Era. Serena, who joined Venus as a professional two years later, would become a 23-time Grand Slam champion and considered by many to be the greatest female player in tennis history.

Cast

Ayan Broomfield was the body double for select scenes of Venus Williams matches.

Production

The project was announced in March 2019 with Will Smith set to play Williams, from Zach Baylin's screenplay. Warner Bros. was the successful bidder for the film. Reinaldo Marcus Green signed as director in June.
 
In January 2020, Demi Singleton and Saniyya Sidney were cast as Serena and Venus, and Aunjanue Ellis as their mother Oracene Price. Jon Bernthal also entered negotiations to play Rick Macci. In February, Liev Schreiber and Susie Abromeit (uncredited in the final film) joined the cast; and in March, Dylan McDermott, Katrina Begin and Judith Chapman.

Principal photography began in January 2020 in Los Angeles. According to the California Film Commission, the production spent $35.6 million in the state, with $7.5 million returned in tax credits. In March 2020, filming was halted due to the COVID-19 pandemic. In October 2020, Tony Goldwyn joined the cast, replacing Schreiber, who dropped out due to a scheduling conflict as a result of the pandemic. Filming resumed later that month.

Will Smith reportedly received $40 million for his role. When production concluded, he reportedly gave his co-stars "a nice bonus" via checks, due to the decision to release the film in theatres and on HBO Max simultaneously, on top of the compensation already received from the studio.

The film features the original song "Be Alive" by Beyoncé, released on November 12, 2021.

Release
The film premiered at the Telluride Film Festival on September 2, 2021, and was released on November 19, 2021, in theaters and on HBO Max. It was previously scheduled to be released on November 25, 2020, but it was delayed due to the COVID-19 pandemic. The film was chosen to close the AFI Fest on November 14, 2021; that same day, it closed the New Orleans Film Festival's live screenings. By the end of its run, it will have also screened at film festivals in London, Chicago, Savannah, Miami, Indianapolis, Denver, Middleburg, Philadelphia, Sydney, Toruń, and Morelia. The film will also open the 25th American Black Film Festival (ABFF), with president and general manager Nicole Friday describing King Richard as "a film that is a touchstone of ABFF's legacy of showcasing extraordinary Black talent and inspiring storytelling reflecting the brilliance of diversity in Hollywood."

The film was released on Blu-ray and DVD February 8, 2022 by Warner Bros. Home Entertainment, with the 4K Ultra HD release through Warner Archive Collection on the same date.

Reception

Audience viewership 
Samba TV reported to Deadline Hollywood that the film was streamed by 707,000 U.S. households on HBO Max in its first 3 days of release on the platform. In addition, it stated that 59% of the viewers were female and 54% African Americans. HBO Max Executive Vice President and General Manager Andy Forssell praised the film for being watched without interruptions unlike other day-and-date titles, while Warner Bros. Pictures Chairman and Chief Content Officer Toby Emmerich stated that the company was pleased with the film's initial streaming performance. It was streamed by nearly 2 million U.S. households by the end of its first 30 days on HBO Max. By March 20, the film had been streamed in 2.6 million households in the United States, including 403,000 since the Oscar nomination announcements on February 8.

Box office 
King Richard grossed $15.1million in the United States and Canada, and $24.3million in other territories, for a worldwide total of $39.4million.

In the United States and Canada, the film was released alongside Ghostbusters: Afterlife, and was projected to gross $8–10 million from 3,250 theaters in its opening weekend. The film made $1.9 million on its first day, and went on to debut to $5.7 million. The low figure was attributed to the 145 minute runtime, as well as the film's availability on HBO Max. The film made $4.8 million over the five-day Thanksgiving frame, including $3.3 million (-33%) in its second weekend, finishing seventh. In its third weekend, the film earned $1.2 million, finishing ninth. King Richard dropped out of the box office top ten in its fourth weekend, earning $510,306 and finishing twelfth.

Venus and Serena Williams about the film
Both Venus and Serena are listed as executive producers on the film, a title they approved only after viewing the finished product. Serena said: "I think it was a great opportunity to see how amazing African-American fathers are. A lot of black men aren't seen in that light. And a lot of people think that my dad was a different character. He wanted us to have fun first over anything. That's the thing that I loved most." According to Serena and Venus, the film is as true to reality "as possible."

Critical response 

 On Metacritic, the film has a weighted average score of 76 out of 100, based on 53 critics, indicating "generally favorable reviews". Audiences polled by CinemaScore gave the film an average grade of "A" on an A+ to F scale, while those at PostTrak gave it a 94% positive score, with 89% saying they would definitely recommend it.

Kevin Maher of The Times gave the film 4/5 stars, writing: "A towering turn from Will Smith, his best since Ali and one of the year's great screen performances, defines nearly every frame of this film." Justin Chang of the Los Angeles Times described the film as "an engrossing family drama that doubles as a sharp rethink of how a family operates within the overlapping, often overbearing spheres of race, class, sports and celebrity." Joe Morgenstern of The Wall Street Journal criticized the film's length, but said that it was "a sports movie that transcends itself without losing track of itself." Wendy Ide of The Guardian gave the film 4/5 stars, describing it as a "crowd-pleasing biopic" and writing: "Smith is excellent, fully inhabiting the character in one of the only roles to date that has required him to fully shed his habitual gloss of Will Smith charm." Clarisse Loughrey of The Independent also praised Smith's performance, writing: "It's one of those impressive fusions between actor and character, which all comes across so effortlessly onscreen, but gives King Richard the lifeblood it needs to triumph as a film."  K. Austin Collins of Rolling Stone wrote: "The movie's brightest-burning idea, and it is sincerely moving, is that Richard, for his flaws, does what he does on behalf of the young black women he's raising. This rings true in real life and in fiction."

Allegra Frank of Slate was more critical of the film, writing: "Venus and Serena Williams are the names we rightly remember, but King Richard remains fixated on the male bravado that pushed for them to get their names out there in the first place." Kyle Smith of National Review wrote that the film "makes the sororal tennis champs seem almost incidental to their own rise to greatness." Jesse Hassenger of The A.V. Club gave the film a grade of C+, writing that it "keeps enough of Richard's messy past off screen to feel like a hagiography with a few concessions, rather than a true warts-and-all portrait."

Accolades

References

External links
 
 
 Official screenplay

2021 biographical drama films
2021 films
2020s sports drama films
African-American films
American biographical drama films
American sports drama films
Biographical films about sportspeople
Films about father–daughter relationships
Film productions suspended due to the COVID-19 pandemic
Films about families
Films about sisters
Films about parenting
Films featuring a Best Drama Actor Golden Globe winning performance
Films postponed due to the COVID-19 pandemic
Films produced by Will Smith
Films scored by Kris Bowers
Films set in Florida
Films set in Los Angeles County, California
Films set in Oakland, California
Films set in 1991
Films set in 1994
Films set in the 1990s
Films shot in Florida
Films shot in Los Angeles
Golden Raspberry Award winning films
HBO Max films
Overbrook Entertainment films
Tennis films
Warner Bros. films
Serena Williams
Venus Williams
Williams family (tennis)
Films featuring a Best Actor Academy Award-winning performance
2020s English-language films
2020s American films